"Proxy" is a song by Dutch DJ and record producer Martin Garrix. It was released as a free download on 6 March 2014 and on 2 July 2014 on iTunes. The song has charted in the Netherlands.

Chart performance

Weekly charts

Release history

References

2014 singles
Martin Garrix songs
Songs written by Martin Garrix
2014 songs
Spinnin' Records singles